Vertregt is the ancient remnant of a large lunar impact crater. It is located on the far side of the Moon, to the north of the unusual walled plain Van de Graaff. The prominent crater Aitken lies across the northeast rim of Vertregt, and Zwicky is attached to the northwestern rim.

Vertregt has been heavily eroded and reshaped by subsequent events, leaving only a few segments of the outer rim still visible. The northwestern section of the rim is the most intact portion, although even this arcing ridge is marked by small craterlets.

The interior consists of rugged ridges and smaller impacts, most prominently the crater pair of Vertregt L and Vertregt K in the southeast. There is a wide rift leading from the southern end of the crater floor towards Van de Graaff.

Satellite craters
By convention these features are identified on lunar maps by placing the letter on the side of the crater midpoint that is closest to Vertregt.

References

 
 
 
 
 
 
 
 
 
 
 
 

Impact craters on the Moon